Bethencourtia is a genus of flowering plants in the daisy family, Asteraceae. It contains three species of plants endemic to the Canary Islands.

Species:  
Bethencourtia hermosae
Bethencourtia palmensis
Bethencourtia rupicola

References

Senecioneae
Asteraceae genera
Endemic flora of the Canary Islands
Taxa named by Jacques Denys Choisy